Soleymani (also Romanized as Soleymānī; also known as Salmānīyeh and Soleymānīyeh-ye Pā’īn) is a village in Abravan Rural District, Razaviyeh District, Mashhad County, Razavi Khorasan Province, Iran. At the 2006 census, its population was 712, in 146 families.

References 

Populated places in Mashhad County